Châtelus may refer to the following communes in France:

 Châtelus, Allier, a commune in the Allier department in the Auvergne-Rhône-Alpes region
 Châtelus, Isère, a commune in the Isère department in the Auvergne-Rhône-Alpes region
 Châtelus, Loire, a commune in the Loire department in the Auvergne-Rhône-Alpes region
 Châtelus-le-Marcheix, a commune in the Creuse department in the Nouvelle-Aquitaine region
 Châtelus-Malvaleix, a commune in the Creuse department in the Nouvelle-Aquitaine region